Łączna  is a village in Skarżysko County, Świętokrzyskie Voivodeship, in south-central Poland. It is the seat of the gmina (administrative district) called Gmina Łączna.

The village has a population of 780.

References

Villages in Skarżysko County